Lagator Hall (Serbian: Hala Lagator, Serbian Cyrillic: Хала Лагатор) or Lagator Sports Centre (Serbian: Sportski centar Lagator, Serbian Cyrillic: Хала Лагатор) is an indoor arena in Loznica. It has a capacity of 2236 people. It was finished in 1984. It is the home arena of KK Loznica.

References

See also
List of indoor arenas in Serbia

Loznica
Indoor arenas in Serbia